Christmas Rathri is a 1961 Indian Malayalam-language film, directed and produced by P. Subramaniam and was filmed at Merryland Studio. The film stars T. K. Balachandran, Thikkurissy Sukumaran Nair, Miss Kumari, Soman and Adoor Pankajam. The film had musical score by Br. Lakshmanan. The plot revolves around Advocate George (Thikkurissi) and Annie (Miss Kumari). Despite its title, the film has very little to do with Christmas, except that the climax of the film occurs on Christmas Eve. The film was made in Tamil also and released on 22 September 1961 as Yar Manamagan?.

Cast
 
T. K. Balachandran as Dr. Mathews
Thikkurissy Sukumaran Nair as George
Soman 
Adoor Pankajam as Mariya
Aranmula Ponnamma as Annamma
Ambika Sukumaran as Gracy 
Bahadoor as Kurian
Kannamma
Kottarakkara Sreedharan Nair as Valyedathu Vareechan
Miss Kumari as Annie
N. Govindankutty as Philip
Pankajavalli as Thresiamma
Paravoor Bharathan as Porinchu
S. P. Pillai as Thoma
Benjamin F.

Soundtrack
The music was composed by Br. Lakshmanan and the lyrics were written by P. Bhaskaran.

See also
 List of Christmas films

References

External links
 

1961 films
1960s Christmas films
1960s Malayalam-language films
Indian drama films
Malayalam films remade in other languages
Films directed by P. Subramaniam
1961 drama films
Indian Christmas films
Christianity in India
Films about Christianity
Films scored by Br Lakshmanan